Best of Pandora is the first greatest hits album by Swedish Eurodance singer Pandora. It features tracks from Pandora's first two studio album, One of a Kind and Tell the World. The album was released in February 1997.

The album includes four Swedish top ten and six Finnish top ten singles.

Track listing
 "Trust Me" – 3:25
 "Tell the World" – 3:37
 "Come On And Do It" – 3:18
 "Don't You Know" – 3:49
 "One of a Kind" – 3:37
 "The Naked Sun" – 3:58
 "Something's Gone"  (Ragga Dance Cut)  – 4:21
 "Take My Hand" – 3:52
 "One of Us" – 4:46
 "Going to the Top" – 3:47
 "Love is a Stranger" – 3:45
 "Get Your Chance" – 4:00
 "Rely" – 4:24
 "Come On And Do It"  (Rhythm Takes Control Mix)  – 6:02
 "Tell the World" (Straight Outta Kalahari) – 3:49
 "The Naked Sun" (The Beduin House Camp) – 4:16
 "Don't You Know" (Peka P's Alternative Cut) – 5:35
 "Something's Gone" (Original Version) – 4:16

Certifications

Release history

References

Pandora (singer) albums
1997 compilation albums
Virgin Records albums
Compilation albums by Swedish artists